Ole Stenen (29 August 1903 in Øyer, Gudbrandsdal – 23 April 1975) was a Norwegian Nordic skier who competed in nordic combined and cross-country skiing in the 1920s and early 1930s.

He was born in Øyer and represented the club Øyer IL. He died in April 1975 in Oslo.

He won a Nordic combined silver at the 1932 Winter Olympics in Lake Placid, New York. In addition, he won the 50 km cross-country event at both the 1931 World Ski Championships and the 1931 Holmenkollen ski festival. He also won silver in the Nordic combined at the 1929 World Ski Championships and finished fourth at the 1934 World Ski Championships. Because of those wins, Stenen shared the Holmenkollen medal in 1931 with fellow Norwegian Hans Vinjarengen, a fellow Nordic combined athlete.

He participated in the demonstration event, military patrol (precursor to biathlon), in the 1928 Winter Olympics.

Cross-country skiing results
All results are sourced from the International Ski Federation (FIS).

Olympic Games

World Championships
 4 medals – (1 gold, 1 silver, 2 bronze)

References

External links
 

1903 births
1975 deaths
People from Øyer
Cross-country skiers at the 1932 Winter Olympics
Military patrol competitors at the 1928 Winter Olympics
Nordic combined skiers at the 1932 Winter Olympics
Norwegian military patrol (sport) runners
Norwegian male cross-country skiers
Norwegian male Nordic combined skiers
Olympic biathletes of Norway
Olympic cross-country skiers of Norway
Olympic Nordic combined skiers of Norway
Olympic silver medalists for Norway
Holmenkollen medalists
Holmenkollen Ski Festival winners
Olympic medalists in Nordic combined
FIS Nordic World Ski Championships medalists in cross-country skiing
FIS Nordic World Ski Championships medalists in Nordic combined
Medalists at the 1932 Winter Olympics
Sportspeople from Innlandet